Mirrorthrone is a Swiss one-man symphonic black metal band formed by Vladimir Cochet in 2000.

Biography
Mirrorthrone was formed in 2000 by Vladimir Cochet, the only member of the one man project. In late 2001 and 2002, two demo CDs were recorded, which drew the attention of Red Stream Inc. After signing to Red Stream Inc. The first Mirrothrone album was Of Wind and Weeping. The follow-up album, Carriers of Dust followed in 2006, and received even more positive reviews. Following the positive feedback for his second album, Vladimir soon announced that he was preparing another album, Gangrene, which ended up being released on April 14, 2008.

Controversy
The lyrics to "A Scream to Express the Hate of a Race" were frequently misinterpreted as being racist. As a result, Cochet issued the following statement on Mirrorthrone's website:

This is an answer to the polemic which is current at the moment on the Internet. No, Mirrorthrone is NOT racist, nazi, white pride or whatever you call it. The lyrics of the song "A Scream to Express the Hate of a Race" target the human race in its entirety. It attacks what is called the "nihilism" of a certain form of society that has been spreading around the globe and that envelops the "moral, social, religious and scientific" paradigms. I am not going to develop more for my aim is not to offer text analysis of what I have written; I only want to clarify the situation. Please read and understand at least a minimum before commenting.

Members
 Vladimir Cochet - vocals, guitars, bass, synthesizer, drum programming

Past members
 Marthe - female vocals

Discography
 Of Wind and Weeping (Red Stream Inc., 2003)
 Carriers of Dust (2006)
 Gangrene  (2008)

References

External links
Official website
Encyclopedia Metallum Article
Review of Carriers of Dust and Interview with Vladimir''

Musical groups established in 2000
Swiss black metal musical groups
Swiss symphonic metal musical groups